The Indian Judicial collegium system, where existing judges appoint judges to the nation's constitutional courts, has its genesis in, and continued basis resting on, three of its own judgments made by Supreme Court judges  which are collectively known as the Three Judges Cases.

The cases

Following are the three cases:
 S. P. Gupta v. Union of India - 1981 (also known as the Judges' Transfer case)
 Supreme Court Advocates-on Record Association vs Union of India - 1993 
 In re Special Reference 1 of 1998

Over the course of the three cases, the court evolved the principle of judicial independence to mean that no other branch of the state - including the legislature and the executive - would have any say in the appointment of judges. The court then created the collegium system, which has been in use since the judgment in the Second Judges Case  was issued in 1993. There is no mention of the collegium either in the original Constitution of India or in successive amendments.

The Third Judges Case of 1998  is not a case but an opinion delivered by the Supreme Court of India responding to a question of law regarding the collegium system, raised by then President of India K. R. Narayanan, in July 1998 under his constitutional powers.

Further, in January 2013, the court dismissed as without locus standi, a public interest litigation filed by NGO Suraz India Trust that sought to challenge the collegium system of appointment.

In July 2013, Chief Justice of India P. Sathasivam spoke against any attempts to change the collegium system.

On 5 September 2013, the Rajya Sabha passed The Constitution (120th Amendment) bill, 2013, that amends articles 124(2) and 217(1) of the Constitution of India, 1950 and establishes the National Judicial Appointments Commission, on whose recommendation the President would appoint judges to the higher judiciary.

The amendment was struck down by the Supreme Court for being unconstitutional on 16 October, 2015. The constitutional bench of Justices J. S. Khehar, Madan Lokur, Kurian Joseph and Adarsh Kumar Goel had declared the 99th Amendment and NJAC Act unconstitutional while Justice Chelameswar upheld it.

Judicial meaning of the word "Recommendation"
In judgement on the presidential reference, Supreme Court has dealt elaborately, the modality of rendering recommendation by a constitutional entity such as Supreme Court, President of India, etc, It is not at the discretion of the person consulted to render the recommendation but internal consultations with the peers shall be made in writing and the recommendation shall be made in accordance with the internal consultations.here internal consultations refer to panel of existing Supreme Court judges appointed by existing judges.

National Judicial Appointments Commission Act
The Lok Sabha on 13 August 2014 and the Rajya Sabha on 14 August 2014 passed the National Judicial Appointments Commission (NJAC) Bill, 2014 to scrap the collegium system of appointment of Judges. The President of India has given his assent to the National Judicial Appointments Commission Bill, 2014 on 31 December 2014, after which the bill has been renamed as the National Judicial Appointments Commission Act, 2014.

99th Amendment and NJAC Act quashed by Supreme court
By a majority opinion of 4:1, on 16 October 2015, Supreme Court struck down the constitutional amendment and the NJAC Act restoring the two-decade old collegium system of judges appointing judges in higher judiciary. Supreme Court declared that NJAC is interfering with the autonomy of the judiciary by the executive which amounts to tampering of the basic structure of the constitution where parliament is not empowered to change the basic structure. However, the Supreme Court also acknowledged that the collegium system of judges appointing judges is lacking transparency and credibility which would be rectified/improved by the Judiciary.

See also
National Judicial Appointments Commission
Kesavananda Bharati v. State of Kerala

References

Indian constitutional case law
Supreme Court of India cases